Murphy Lakes may refer to:
Murphy Lakes (Georgia)
Murphy Lakes (Washington)
Murphy Lakes (Wyoming)
Haynach Lakes
Snowdrift Lake

See also
Murphy Lake (disambiguation)